Pensions in Canada can be public, private, and collective, or come from individual savings.

The Canada Pension Plan (CPP) forms the basic state pension system. All those employed aged 18 or older must contribute a portion of their income to a pension plan. In all provinces and territories except Quebec, these plans are administered by Employment and Social Development Canada, while Quebec administers them separately with the Quebec Pension Plan (QPP). Upon retiring, a contributor receives regular CPP pension payments equal to 25% of the earnings on which CPP contributions were made over the entire working life of a contributor from age 18 in constant dollars. Adjustments are made according to the Consumer Price Index. Although one can claim a CPP pension at age 60 rather than the typical retirement age of 65, as of 2016, those who claim it at 60 have their pension reduced by 36%.

Canada also maintains the Registered Retirement Savings Plan, which maintains personal accounts for holding savings and investment assets.

In addition to the public pension system, some employers maintain private pension plans for their employees. Investments into these plans are not subjected to taxation until retirement. Private pension plans are subjected to various regulations among the provinces and territories, and must be registered with the authorities.

Pension Coverage by Plan in Canada
In 2014, Statistics Canada published results of a study regarding pension coverage in Canada according to citizens under defined benefit (DB) plans versus defined contribution (DC) plans.  The study found that in the period 1977–2011, the proportion of the overall employed population covered by registered pension plans (RPPs) decreased approximately 15% (from 52% to 37%) among men due mainly to a decline in DB plan coverage. For women, RPP coverage actually increased 4% in the period.  
The number of private sector DB plans are declining at fast rate in Canada due to the increased popularity of DC and hybrid plans. If the trend continues to decline at such a rate, Canada is likely to see the death of private sector DB plans by the year 2026.  However, it is important to note that DB plans remain the plan of choice for the Public sector in Canada based on Statistics Canada data.

Canada Model

Canada's pensions are marked by marked differences from contemporary American and European plans, in what has been broadly termed "The Canadian Model". Primary characteristics of the model include governance that is insulated from political pressures, a focus on illiquid, alternative asset classes like infrastructure and real estate, and a strong preference for in-house management of investments and direct investment. The aim of the strategy employed in the country is muting volatility and focusing on long-term returns. 

The in-house management style stands in stark contrast to the Yale Model popularized by David Swensen in the United States, while maintaining a similar focus on illiquid asset classes in search of market inefficiencies. According to a 2013 Boston Consulting Group study, over 75% of assets in the top 10 largest pension funds in Canada were managed by internal staff. This strategy comes with the dual benefit of greater control over investment and cost-reduction from streamlined organizational costs, according to Canadian proponents. 

During the Great Recession this model appeared to be a beneficial hedging mechanism, as Canada's pension system saw smaller, though still marked, losses than many American and European funds. 

However, this model has been criticized for its talent acquisition given the salaries required to attract top investment talent to the public sector entities rather than the lucrative private asset management industry and the large teams necessary to oversee the niche asset classes preferred by Canadian pensions. 

Additionally, the Bank of Canada has voiced concerns that overzealous pursuit of illiquid asset classes and over-leveraging through repo and derivatives markets by the largest eight Canadian pensions has led to a potentially dangerous situation should significant financial stress akin to 2008 resurface. The Bank noted that the low-interest rate environment leftover from the financial crisis has driven Canadian pensions into more complex and more illiquid investment strategies, necessitating more attention to risk management in the future.

See also
Pension regulation in Canada
Canada Pension Plan
Old Age Security
Quebec Pension Plan
Registered Retirement Savings Plan
Saskatchewan Pension Plan

Notes